Harvey D. Wedeen (March 23rd, 1927 - March 13th, 2015) was an American classical pianist and piano teacher. He served as the chair of the keyboard department at the Boyer College of Music and Dance at Temple University in Philadelphia for 51 years until 2012. Wedeen's early musical training includes piano studies with renowned French pianists Robert Casadesus and Gaby Casadesus, as well as music theory and composition studies with legendary French composer, pianist, conductor, and teacher Nadia Boulanger. After receiving a degree in French literature at Columbia University, he studied under the tutelage of Adele Marcus at the Juilliard School, obtaining a master's degree in piano performance in 1951. Wedeen began to teach at Temple University in 1964, and he played a vital role in establishing and developing the performance, pedagogy, and early music programs at the keyboard department at Temple. Musicians he recruited to the keyboard department include classical pianists Lambert Orkis, Alexander Fiorillo, and harpsichordist and early music scholar Joyce Lindorff. He retired in 2012 and continued to teach shortly before his death. His notable students include Canadian pianist Marc-André Hamelin, American pianist Charles Abramovic, Durch/Israeli pianist and early keyboard performer Michael Tsalka, Canadian pianist Marc Durand, and Italian-American pianist Robert Durso.

Harvey Wedeen was the husband of American violinist and string teacher Helen Kwalwasser. In 2011, they together received the Lifetime Achievement Award from The Musical Fund Society of Philadelphia, one of the oldest musical societies in the U.S. One of their two daughters, Lisa Wedeen, is the Mary R. Morton Professor of Political Science and the College and co-director of the Chicago Center for Contemporary Theory at The University of Chicago.

References 

1927 births
2015 deaths
Temple University faculty
Columbia University School of the Arts alumni
Juilliard School alumni
Classical pianists
American classical pianists
20th-century classical pianists
21st-century classical pianists
20th-century American musicians
21st-century American musicians
20th-century American pianists
21st-century American pianists